Robert Lincoln McNeil Jr. (July 13, 1915 – May 20, 2010) was an American chemist and pharmaceutical industry executive.  He was responsible for, among other things, the commercial development, naming, and introduction of the pain reliever Tylenol.

McNeil was born in Bethel, Connecticut, on July 13, 1915, and was raised in the Germantown neighborhood of Philadelphia. He earned two undergraduate degrees, the first in 1936 from Yale University, where he majored in physiological chemistry and bacteriology, after which he started working part-time at the family's pharmaceutical business, McNeil Laboratories, Inc., which was run by his father, R. Lincoln McNeil. He earned a second bachelor's degree in 1938, this from the Philadelphia College of Pharmacy and Science.

After completing college in 1938, he joined McNeil Laboratories full-time, coming on board to what had been the family business for three generations having been founded in 1879. The company had been founded as a corner drug store and had grown into selling medicines on a commercial basis. He began the process of transforming the company, adding a research and development group to develop new prescription medications and restructuring the array of products being offered for sale.

To compete with the aspirin products sold by his company's competitors and having heard of work being done on the chemical by researchers, McNeil started in 1951 pursuing the development of what he named "acetaminophen", a chemical that had been discovered decades earlier but was little tested at the time as a pain reliever. The chemical's name N-acetyl-p-aminophenol was the source for the generic name "acetaminophen" (N-acetyl-p-aminophenol) coined by McNeil, as well as of the brand name "Tylenol" (N-acetyl-p-aminophenol), which was coined by a colleague. McNeil recognized that high production costs would mean that the product would have to sell at a higher price than the commonly available aspirin, but that it would have the benefit of not causing stomach irritation. Tylenol was initially approved by the United States Food and Drug Administration in 1955 for sale on a prescription basis, and became available for sale to consumers over the counter in 1960. Elixir Tylenol, a liquid medicine advertised "for little hotheads" went on sale as the first product bearing the Tylenol brand name. McNeil was named chairman of McNeil in 1956 and he remained as chairman of the company after it was purchased in 1960 by Johnson & Johnson for $30 million in stock and was operated as a subsidiary of that firm.

In 2006, the Philadelphia Museum of Art exhibited 50 pieces of presidential china that McNeil donated to the museum, part of a collection of 450 pieces that ranged from the presidencies of George Washington through Ronald Reagan. The collection includes a large number of pieces of the rare Lincoln china service. The collection was described by The New York Times as being "considered one of the most important outside the White House".

McNeil also created the Barra Foundation, dedicating to helping non-profits to improve life in the greater Philadelphia area.

McNeil died of heart failure at age 94 on May 20, 2010, at his Wyndmoor, Pennsylvania, home. He was survived by his wife, the former Nancy McKinney Jones, as well as by two daughters, two sons and 11 grandchildren.

Awards
2005 Membership to the American Philosophical Society
2005 American Institute of Chemists Gold Medal

External links

References

1915 births
2010 deaths
American chemists
American pharmacologists
People from Montgomery County, Pennsylvania
Scientists from Philadelphia
University of the Sciences alumni
Yale University alumni
People from Bethel, Connecticut
People associated with the Philadelphia Museum of Art
Members of the American Philosophical Society